Jordan Scott Cronenweth,  (February 20, 1935 – November 29, 1996) was an American cinematographer based in Los Angeles, California. A contemporary of Conrad Hall, he was recognized for his distinctive style of heavily textured, film noir-inspired photography, seen in numerous classic films, including Zandy's Bride, Gable and Lombard, Altered States, and Peggy Sue Got Married. He is perhaps best remembered for his BAFTA Award-winning work on the groundbreaking science fiction film Blade Runner, which is credited as codifying the cyberpunk aesthetic, and is lauded by some as among the best cinematographers of all time.

He was nominated for an Academy Award for Best Cinematography and received an ASC Award for Outstanding Achievement in Cinematography in Theatrical Releases, and he is widely considered one of the most influential cinematographers of all time.

He was a member of the American Society of Cinematographers (ASC).

Life and career 
Born in Los Angeles, California on February 20, 1935, Cronenweth attended North Hollywood High School and later Los Angeles City College, majoring in Engineering. While in college he interned as a film lab assistant at Columbia Pictures and acted as a cameraman on the 1955 musical film Oklahoma!.

His widely acclaimed work on the science fiction-noir Blade Runner won the Best Cinematography Award from the Los Angeles Film Critics Association and got a BSC Award nomination and BAFTA Film Award. He won a 1987 ASC Award and earned an Academy Award nomination for Peggy Sue Got Married.

Cronenweth was initially hired as the director of photography for The Adventures of Buckaroo Banzai Across the 8th Dimension, but halfway through production producers replaced him with Fred J. Koenekamp.

He was also replaced two weeks into the production of Alien 3 after falling ill, and died in 1996 at the age of 61. The cause of death was Parkinson's disease.

A 2003 poll of his peers conducted by the International Cinematographers Guild placed Cronenweth among the ten most influential cinematographers of all time.

Personal life 
He and his first wife Carol had three children, Christie Cronenweth, Tim Cronenweth, and two-time Oscar-nominated cinematographer Jeff Cronenweth. He was later married to Shane Cronenweth for 17 years.

Cronenweth was originally misdiagnosed with multiple sclerosis in 1978, and correctly diagnosed with Parkinson’s disease in 1981. He continued working in film and commercials as a cinematographer, and in several commercials as director/cameraman, for another 13 years despite considerable physical challenges.

Filmography 

Concert films

References

External links

BRmovie.com – Jordan Cronenweth Profile

1935 births
1996 deaths
American cinematographers
Best Cinematography BAFTA Award winners
Deaths from Parkinson's disease
Film people from Los Angeles
Los Angeles City College alumni
Neurological disease deaths in California
North Hollywood High School alumni